Jean-Louis Romeuf (27 September 1766 – 9 September 1812) was a French general of the First French Empire during the Napoleonic Wars. He was born in the department of Haute-Loire. He began his military service in 1789. He was promoted to general de brigade (brigadier general) in 1811. He was mortally wounded at the Battle of Borodino on 7 September 1812 and died 2 days later.

Coat of arms

External links
  ;
 ROMEUF Jean-Louis sur lesapn.forumactif.fr ;
 Service historique de la Défense – Château de Vincennes – Dossier S.H.A.T. Cote : 8 Yd 1 283.

1766 births
1812 deaths
Generals of the First French Empire
Barons of the First French Empire
Commandeurs of the Légion d'honneur
People from Haute-Loire
Military personnel killed in the Napoleonic Wars
Names inscribed under the Arc de Triomphe